The 1994–95 International Hockey League season was the third season of the International Hockey League, the top level of ice hockey in Russia. 28 teams participated in the league, and HK Dynamo Moscow won the championship by defeating HK Lada Togliatti in the final.

Regular season

Western Conference

Eastern Conference

Playoffs

External links
Season on hockeyarchives.ru

1994–95 in Russian ice hockey leagues
International Hockey League (1992–1996) seasons